The Giardino dei Semplici is a botanical garden in  Bagnacavallo, Province of Ravenna, Emilia-Romagna, central Italy.

The garden was established in 2004 on the former Palazzo Graziani grounds, and currently contains over 300 types of herbs and woody plants. It is divided into four sections and features fruit trees, roses, grasses, legumes, and traditional food plants.

See also 
 List of botanical gardens in Italy

References 
 Comune di Bagnacavallo 2004 (Italian)
 Monzaflora article (Italian)

Botanical gardens in Italy
Gardens in Emilia-Romagna